The UK Armed Forces Polo Association (formerly the Combined Services Polo Club) oversees the sport of polo within the three armed services of the United Kingdom. The Royal Navy and Royal Marine Equestrian Association, the Army Polo Association and the Royal Air Force Polo Club are subordinate to the organisation.

The UKAFPA's patron is the Prince of Wales, and its president is General Sir James Everard.

Polo was first played by cavalry of the British Army in 1871, and in 1922 a club was established in the grounds of Tedworth House, Wiltshire, where polo is still played.

References

External links
 

Polo clubs in the United Kingdom
Sport in Wiltshire